Sveta Nedelja or, until 1991, Sveta Nedjelja is a town in Zagreb County, Croatia. It is one of the provincial satellite towns in Zagreb's metropolitan region.

Geography 
Sveta Nedelja is situated west of Zagreb near the town of Samobor. It has an exit on the A3 motorway, which passes northwest-southeast through the town, and Franjo Tuđman Street going east-west towards the Podsused Bridge.

Population 
In the Croatian census of 2011, the total population of the Town of Sveta Nedelja was 18,059, divided into 14 settlements:

 Bestovje, population 2,402
 Brezje, population 1,506
 Jagnjić Dol, population 486
 Kalinovica, population 385
 Kerestinec, population 1,433
 Mala Gorica, population 623
 Novaki, population 2,091
 Orešje, population 1,043
 Rakitje, population 2,301
 Srebrnjak, population 128
 Strmec, population 3,907
 Sveta Nedelja, population 1,338
 Svetonedeljski Breg, population 177
 Žitarka, population 239

Administration 

Town government, health-service, post office are the part of infrastructure of Sveta Nedelja.
Head of the Town government is a Mayor (current mayor is Dario Zurovec) with head town administration.

Economy 
Rimac Automobili has its headquarters in the town. It is also the wealthiest municipality in Zagreb County and one of the wealthiest municipalities in the country and with most registered small enterprises in the country.

Monuments and Sightseeing
There are several monuments and buildings for sightseers in the Town of Sveta Nedelja:
Baroquesqe Holy Trinity parish church and parish house in Sveta Nedelja
The old parish house "Crkvenjak" in Sveta Nedelja
St. Rocco Chapel in Sveta Nedelja
Medieval Erdödy Castle in Kerestinec
Old mansions in Brezje and Rakitje
Baroquesqe St. Andrew chapel in Novaki
St. Mary Magdalena chapel in Mala Gorica
Monument to the victims of communist crimes

Education
Primary education in Sveta Nedelja is covered by two elementary schools - the Sveta Nedelja Elementary School in Sveta Nedelja and the Vladimir Deščak Elementary School in Novaki.  Sveta Nedelja Elementary School also has two branch offices in Kerestinec and Strmec. Another branch office is located in Rakov Potok in the Samobor municipal area. Opening a new elementary school in Strmec is planned in the near future.

Notable People
Mihalj Šilobod Bolšić (1724–1787) - Roman Catholic priest, mathematician, writer, and musical theorist primarily known for writing the first Croatian arithmetic textbook Arithmatika Horvatzka (published in Zagreb, 1758)

References

External links

 Town of Sveta Nedelja Official website
 Sveta Nedelja live news portal 

Populated places in Zagreb County
Cities and towns in Croatia